The Asia Game Changer Awards is an annual award ceremony held in recognition of individuals and organizations within and connected to the Asian community that have made positive contributions to the development and improvement of Asia and society.

Inaugurated in 2014 by New York-based non-profit organization the Asia Society, in partnership with Citibank, the first ceremony was held at the United Nations headquarters in New York City. A total of thirteen honorees were awarded, including Nobel laureate Malala Yousafzai and internet entrepreneur Jack Ma, who was honoured as the first ever Game Changer of the Year. Nominees are selected from individuals and institutions nominated from the Asia Society's global network, which then embarks on a three-month long process of feedback and voting that results in the final awardees. While recipients are usually from varying diverse backgrounds, the 2019 ceremony marked the first time that all awardees for the year were women only. 

Due to the COVID-19 pandemic in the United States, the 2020 and 2021 ceremonies were held online.

Ceremonies

Honorees

Special awards

References

Asian awards
Awards established in 2014